János Gyarmati (8 February 1910 in Tapioszele – 29 August 1974 in Budapest) was a Hungarian footballer and coach. He played for Szeged FC, and won three caps for Hungary between 1937 and 1938. He later coached in East Germany, managing VP Dresden, DHfK Leipzig, Vorwärts Berlin and SC Dynamo Berlin, as well as coaching the East Germany national team from 1955 to 1957.

1910 births
1974 deaths
Hungarian footballers
Hungary international footballers
Hungarian football managers
Dynamo Dresden managers
Berliner FC Dynamo managers
East Germany national football team managers
Expatriate football managers in Germany
People from Tápiószele
Association football defenders
Sportspeople from Pest County
Hungarian expatriate sportspeople in East Germany